The Shovel vs. the Howling Bones is Lincoln Durham's debut studio album, released on January 31, 2012 by Rayburn Publishing. Four of the songs on the album are from his 2010 EP, and the other seven are original compositions. Durham was mentored and produced by singer-songwriter Ray Wylie Hubbard, and co-produced by George Reiff. Durham played the majority of the instruments, including a 1929 Gibson HG22 guitar, a bird feeder, a hacksaw, and oil pans.  Drums were performed by Rick Richards.  Other guest musicians from Austin on the album were Derek O'Brien Jeff Plankenhorn, Bucca Allen, and Idgy Vaughn, plus Lincoln Durham's wife, Alissa.

Track list

Personnel

Musicians
 Lincoln Durham – vocals, guitars, fiddle, harmonica
 Rick Richards – drums; bird feeder and trashcan (track 7), cardboard box (track 10)
Special guest musicians
 Ray Wylie Hubbard – guitar (track 4), backup vocals (track 10)
 Jeff Plankenhorn - mandolin (track 2)
 Bucca Allen - grand piano (track 4), accordion (track 11)
 Derek O'Brian - guitar (tracks 1 and 11)
 George Reiff - guitar
 Idgy Vaughn - backup vocals (track 10 and 11)
 Alissa Durham - backup vocals and cardboard box (track 10)
 Clay Berkes - backup vocals (track 9)

References

2012 albums
Lincoln Durham albums